Primera División A (Méxican First A Division) is a Mexican football tournament. This season was composed of Apertura 2004 and Clausura 2005. San Luis was the winner of the promotion to First Division after winning Querétaro in the promotion playoff.

Changes for the 2004–05 season
Leones de Morelos was acquired by new owners, for that reason the team was moved to Querétaro and was renamed to Querétaro F.C.
Azucareros de Córdoba was relocated in Colima and renamed Huracanes de Colima.
Guerreros de Tlaxcala was relocated to Ciudad Obregón and renamed Pioneros de Obregón.
C.D. Guadalajara moved its reserve team, Tapatío, to La Piedad and renamed to Chivas La Piedad.
Atlante F.C. moved its reserve team, Guerreros de Acapulco, to Ciudad Nezahualcóyotl and renamed Potros Neza.
Tigrillos moved from Mexico City to Los Mochis and became Tigrillos Broncos.
Pachuca Juniors and Lobos BUAP were promoted from Second Division.

Stadiums and locations

Apertura 2004

Group league tables

Group 1

Group 2

Group 3

Group 4

General league table

Results

Reclasification series

First leg

Second leg

Liguilla

Quarter-finals

First leg

Second leg

Semi-finals

First leg

Second leg

Final

First leg

Second leg

Clausura 2005

Group league tables

Group 1

Group 2

Group 3

Group 4

General league table

Results

Reclasification series

First leg

Second leg

Liguilla

Quarter-finals

First leg

Second leg

Semi-finals

First leg

Second leg

Final

First leg

Second leg

Relegation table

Promotion final
The Promotion Final faced San Luis against Querétaro to determine the winner of the First Division Promotion. San Luis was the winner.

First leg

Second leg

Relegation play-out
The Football Association determined the celebration of a promotion series between the penultimate team of the Primera 'A' Relegation Table against the runner-up of the Second Division, this series faced Chivas La Piedad against the Cachorros UdeG. Chivas La Piedad won the series and remained in the category.

First leg

Second leg

References

2004–05 in Mexican football
Mexico
Mexico
Ascenso MX seasons